JS Akebono (DD-108) is the eighth ship of s. She was commissioned on 19 March 2002.

Design
The hull design was completely renovated from first-generation destroters. In addition to increasing the size in order to reduce the underwater radiation noise, both the superstructure and hull were inclined to reduce the radar cross-section. There is however no angled tripod mainmast like the one of the American  because of the heavy weather of the Sea of Japan in winter. Destroyers built under the First Defense Build-up Plan, including the former , adopted a unique long forecastle style called "Oranda-zaka".

The remaining one pair were replaced with LM2500 versions, same as in the Kongō class.

Construction and career
Akebono was laid down on 29 October 1999 at IHI Corporation Tokyo as the 1997 plan and launched on 25 September 2000. The vessel was commissioned on 19 March 2002, and was incorporated into the 4th Escort Corps and deployed to Kure.

The destroyer conducted joint training with the navies of each country in the Indo-Pacific region during the deployment.

Gallery

Citations

References 
 
 
 Saunders, Stephen. IHS Jane's Fighting Ships 2013-2014. Jane's Information Group (2003). 

2000 ships
Murasame-class destroyers (1994)
Ships built by IHI Corporation